Jerome Flaake (born 2 March 1990) is a German professional ice hockey left winger who is under contract with ERC Ingolstadt of the Deutsche Eishockey Liga (DEL).

Playing career
Flaake started playing ice hockey at the age of seven at ESV Königsbrunn. Later in his junior career, he played for Augsburger EV, SC Riessersee, Jungadler Mannheim and Kölner Haie.

He was drafted 130th overall by the Toronto Maple Leafs in the 2008 NHL Entry Draft. The Leafs used the Florida Panthers' 5th round choice, which they received in sole compensation for defenseman Wade Belak in a trade on 26 February 2008.

He made his debut in Germany's top-flight Deutsche Eishockey Liga (DEL) for the Kölner Haie in the course of the 2007-08 season. He formerly wore number 90 for Kölner Haie (Cologne Sharks). Two of his four goals for Köln in the 2008–09 season have been game winning goals.

Flaake initially signed a two-year deal with the Hamburg Freezers on 30 March 2010 and then was handed a contract extension through the 2013-14 campaign. After leading the team in scoring during the 2012-13 season, he inked a new five-year deal with the Freezers in May 2013. The team folded in May 2016, which made Flaake a free agent. Shortly after, on 2 June 2016, he signed with fellow DEL side EHC München.

After two championship seasons with EHC München, Flaake left the club in order for more responsibility, agreeing to a three-year contract with Düsseldorfer EG on 15 May 2018.

At the conclusion of his contract with Düsseldorfer EG, Flaake left as a free agent to sign a one-year contract with ERC Ingolstadt on 19 May 2021.

International play 
Flaake made his first World Championship appearance in 2016.

Style of play 
According to Cologne's former general manager Rodion Pauels, Flaake's strengths lie in his skating abilities, intelligence on the ice as well as his nose for the net.

Career statistics

Regular season and playoffs

International

References

External links
 

1990 births
Düsseldorfer EG players
Fischtown Pinguins players
German ice hockey forwards
Hamburg Freezers players
ERC Ingolstadt players
Kölner Haie players
Living people
EHC München players
Sportspeople from Guben
Toronto Maple Leafs draft picks